Washington Township is one of the twenty townships of Darke County, Ohio, United States. The 2010 census found 1,325 people in the township.

Geography
Located in the western part of the county, it borders the following townships:
Jackson Township - north
Brown Township - northeast corner
Greenville Township - east
Liberty Township - south
Greensfork Township, Randolph County, Indiana - southwest
Wayne Township, Randolph County, Indiana - northwest

No municipalities are located in Washington Township.

Name and history
Washington Township was established in 1819. It is one of forty-three Washington Townships statewide.

Government
The township is governed by a three-member board of trustees, who are elected in November of odd-numbered years to a four-year term beginning on the following January 1. Two are elected in the year after the presidential election and one is elected in the year before it. There is also an elected township fiscal officer, who serves a four-year term beginning on April 1 of the year after the election, which is held in November of the year before the presidential election. Vacancies in the fiscal officership or on the board of trustees are filled by the remaining trustees.  The current trustees are Mark Cox, Don Weiss and Luke Leber, and the fiscal officer is Melissa Brawley.  Township Trustees .  Darke County.  Accessed 2007-06-01.

References

External links
County website

Townships in Darke County, Ohio
Townships in Ohio